The Men's Javelin Throw event at the 2006 European Championships in Gothenburg, Sweden had a total number of 24 participating athletes. The final was held on Wednesday August 9, 2006, and the qualifying round on Monday August 7, 2006 with the mark set at 81.00 metres.

Medalists

Schedule
All times are Eastern European Time (UTC+2)

Abbreviations

Records

Qualification

Group A

Group B

Final

See also
 2004 Men's Olympic Javelin Throw (Athens)
 2005 Men's World Championships Javelin Throw (Helsinki)
 2007 Men's World Championships Javelin Throw (Osaka)
 2008 Men's Olympic Javelin Throw (Beijing)

References
 Official results
 todor66
 koti.welho

Javelin throw
Javelin throw at the European Athletics Championships